The Tafarki Foundation is an African charitable foundation.

Mission
The Tafarki Foundation promotes ideas that help local communities address indigenous problems with indigenous solutions:  problems of poor health, malnutrition, hunger, poverty, disease, homelessness, and child abuse affecting the African continent.  The foundation funds healthcare needs through grants to support health related projects such as the Tafarki Health Project and programs such as Pharmacists for Africa, Nurses for Africa and Physicians for Africa.  The Foundation also awards scholarships...

History
It was founded in 2005 with grants from Moses Tafarki and his family, of Yakasawa, Nigeria.

Governance
The Tafarki Foundation is headed by a board of trustees chaired by Rafael Rodriguez.

External links
 Official website

Charities based in Nigeria
Non-profit organizations based in Nigeria
Organizations established in 2005
2005 establishments in Nigeria